The Gatlinburg Bypass (also known as Parkway Bypass or U.S. 441 Bypass) is a  bypass of the resort city of Gatlinburg in Sevier County, Tennessee.  The route is owned and maintained by the National Park Service and is considered part of the Great Smoky Mountains National Park.

Route description
The Gatlinburg Bypass begins at an intersection with U.S. 441 (Newfound Gap Road) within the Great Smoky Mountains National Park southwest of Gatlinburg. It travels generally northward for about half of its route before turning to the northeast and ending at an interchange with U.S. 321/441 (Great Smoky Mountains Parkway) just north of town.

After splitting with U.S. 441, the bypass almost immediately crosses over the West Prong of the Little Pigeon River.  The road then begins to climb in elevation as it traverses Cove Mountain overlooking Gatlinburg from the west.  It crosses over (but does not intersect) Ski Mountain Road, before winding its way over to its only mid-route intersection at Campbell Lead Road, which is accessed via a short two-way access road.  After the intersection, the parkway begins to descend the mountain and again crosses the West Prong of the Little Pigeon River, before ending at a second interchange with U.S. 321/441.

Northbound traffic leaving the bypass can go either direction on "Parkway" (as Great Smoky Mountains Parkway is called locally for brevity): continuing north along the river (the Foothills Parkway "spur" to Pigeon Forge, also maintained by the NPS), or south into downtown Gatlinburg.  Conversely, due to very limited space for an overpass and two lanes of heavy traffic that would have to be crossed without one, traffic from the north end of town cannot access the bypass to go southbound to avoid the almost constant congestion through downtown.  At the south end, southbound traffic on either road can reverse direction to return north on the other.

History

Junctions list

See also

 Blue Ridge Parkway
 Cherohala Skyway
 Foothills Parkway
 Lakeview Drive
 Natchez Trace Parkway
 Ocoee Scenic Byway

References

External links

 
 Great Smoky Mountains National Park

Great Smoky Mountains National Park
Transportation in Sevier County, Tennessee
Protected areas of Sevier County, Tennessee
Gatlinburg, Tennessee
Roads in Tennessee
National Park Service areas in Tennessee
Bypasses in the United States